Evan Comerford (born 18 January 1994) is an Irish Gaelic footballer who plays as a goalkeeper for the Tipperary senior team.

Career
Born in Clonmel, County Tipperary, Comerford first arrived on the inter-county scene at the age of sixteen when he first linked up with the Tipperary minors team before later joining the under-21 side. He made his senior debut during the 2015 league. Comerford immediately became a regular member of the starting fifteen. 
At club level Comerford plays with Kilsheelan–Kilcash.

He made his championship debut in 2015 against Waterford. 
On 31 July 2016, Comerford started as Tipperary defeated Galway in the 2016 All-Ireland Quarter-finals at Croke Park to reach their first All-Ireland semi-final since 1935.
On 21 August 2016, Tipperary were beaten in the semi-final by Mayo on a 2-13 to 0-14 scoreline.

On 30 May 2017, Comerford was handed a 12-week suspension following an incident in a club game on 23 May.	
He was reported by referee Paddy Russell for minor physical interference after he was sent-off against JK Brackens.	
 
On 22 November 2020, Tipperary won the 2020 Munster Senior Football Championship after a 0-17 to 0-14 win against Cork in the final. It was Tipperary's first Munster title in 85 years.

He has a namesake in the Dublin footballer, Evan Comerford, with whom he has sometimes been confused.

Honours

Tipperary
Munster Under-21 Football Championship (1): 2015
All-Ireland Minor Football Championship (1): 2011
Munster Minor Football Championship (2): 2011, 2012
 National Football League Division 3 (1): 2017
Munster Senior Football Championship (1): 2020

References

1994 births
Living people
Kilsheelan-Kilcash Gaelic footballers
Tipperary inter-county Gaelic footballers
Gaelic football goalkeepers